Princess Shova Shahi of Nepal or Shova Rajya Lakshmi Devi (born January 17, 1949) is a former princess of Nepal. She is the youngest daughter of the late King Mahendra of Nepal. She is the only remaining daughter of King Mahendra; her older sisters Princess Shanti and Princess Sharada were murdered in the Royal massacre of Nepal along with The His Majesty King Birendra Bir Bikram Shah Dev and his family.

The name Shobha/Shova means "Grace" and "Splendor".

Life

Princess Shova was born in Kathmandu, the fifth child and youngest daughter of King Mahendra and his first wife, Crown Princess Indra.

She was educated at the Loreto Convent, Darjeeling.

In 1970, she married Kumar Mohan Bahadur Shahi, a descendant of the ruling families of Rukumkot, Jumla and Jajarkot.

On June 1, 2001, ten members of the Nepalese royal family were murdered, reportedly by the Crown Prince Dipendra. Dipendra first shot King Birendra. The wounded king wanted to pick up the weapon that the Crown Prince had left behind and shoot his own son, in an attempt to stop the massacre, but the king was stopped by Princess Shova. Shova must have thought that this was the only weapon in the Crown Prince's possession. She pulled out the magazine. However, the Crown Prince had several other weapons in his possession.  The massacre resulted in the deaths of ten royals (including the Crown Prince, who committed suicide). Princess Shova Shahi herself was wounded but survived.

In 2008, the monarchy in Nepal was abolished. Today, Shova and her brother, the former king Gyanendra, are the only remaining children of King Mahendra.

Patronages 
 Member of the Nepalese Red Cross Society.

Honours 
National Honours
 Member of the Order of Gorkha Dakshina Bahu, 1st class (13 April 1972).
 Member of the Order of Three Divine Powers, 1st class (23 October 2001).
 King Mahendra Investiture Medal (2 May 1956).
 Ati Subikhyata Sewalankar [Renowned Service Medal] (1968).
 Vishesh Sewa [Distinguished Service Medal] (1970).
 King Birendra Investiture Medal (24 February 1975).
 Commemorative Silver Jubilee Medal of King Birendra (31 January 1997).
 King Gyanendra Investiture Medal (4 June 2001).

Foreign honours
  : Dame Grand Cross of the Order of the House of Orange (25 April 1967).
  : Dame Grand Cordon of the Order of the Precious Crown (16 May 1978).

Ancestry

References

1949 births
Nepalese princesses
Nepalese royalty
Living people
Members of the Order of Gorkha Dakshina Bahu, First Class
Members of the Order of Tri Shakti Patta, First Class
Grand Cordons of the Order of the Precious Crown
Grand Crosses of the Order of the House of Orange
20th-century Nepalese nobility
21st-century Nepalese nobility
Nepalese Hindus